El Guayabo River (Rio El Guayabo) is a medium stream in El Salvador, which has moderate to large quantities of fresh water year round, especially from early May through October.

References

Rivers of El Salvador